Pentafluorosulfur hypofluorite is an oxyfluoride of sulfur in the +6 oxidation state, with a fluorine atom attached to oxygen. The formula is SOF6. In standard conditions it is a gas.

Synthesis
SOF6 can be made by reacting thionyl fluoride with fluorine at 200 °C with a silver difluoride catalyst.
SOF2 + 2F2 → SOF6 (+ some SOF4)

Properties
The molecular shape has five fluorine and one oxygen atom arranged around a sulfur atom in an octahedral arrangement. Another fluorine atom is attached to the oxygen in almost a straight line with the S-O connection. So the molecular formula can also be written as SF5OF. The average S-F distance is 1.53 Å. The angles ∠FSF and ∠FSO are 90°.

The 19F nuclear magnetic resonance spectrum of SOF6 compared to SF6 has a -131.5 ppm shift for the hypofluorite fluorine, and 1.75 ppm for the opposite F. The other four fluorine atoms have a shift of 3.64 ppm. Spin coupling of o-F to SF4 is 17.4 Hz, between SF4 and opposite (apex) SF 155 Hz, and between apex and hypofluorite it is 0.0.

Reactions
SOF6 + 2I− + H2O → SO2F2 + I2 + 2HF + 2F−

Alkalis such as potassium hydroxide react

2SOF6 + 12OH− → O2 + 10F− + 5H2O + 2SO3F−

Alkenes react to add to a double bond, with -OSF5 on one carbon, and -F on the other.

C2H4 + SOF6 → FH2CCH2OSF5.

C2F4 + SOF6 → CF3CF2OSF5. C2SOF10 boils at 15°C

SOF6 + ClCH=CH2 → FClCH-CH2-O-SF5

SOF6 + FCH=CH2 → F2CH-CH2-O-SF5

SOF6 + F2C=CH2 → F3C-CH2-O-SF5

SOF6 + SOF4 → mixture of SF6, SOF4, bis-(pentafluorosulfur) peroxide F5SOOSF5 and bis-(pentafluorosulfur) oxide F5SOSF5.

Thermal decomposition produces sulfur hexafluoride and oxygen.
2SOF6 heat over 210° → 2SF6 + O2.

Some reactions of SOF6 result in fluorination of other molecules
SOF6 + CO → F2CO + SOF4.

SOF6 + F2CO → SF5OOCF3

SOF6 + SO3 → F5SOOSO2F

SOF6 + N2F4 → F5SONF2

3SOF6 + Br2 → 2BrF3 + 3SOF4

5SOF6 + I2 → 2IF5 + 5SOF4

PF3 + SOF6 → PF5 + SOF4

NO2 + SOF6 → 2NO2F

References

Fluorides
Sulfur(VI) compounds
Hypofluorites
Gases